Wladyslaw Lizon (born June 27, 1954) is a Polish Canadian former politician. He was a Conservative member of the House of Commons of Canada from 2011 to 2015 who represented the Greater Toronto Area riding of Mississauga East—Cooksville. He was the second Polish-born Member of Parliament, after  Alexandre-Édouard Kierzkowski.

Background
Lizon graduated from the AGH University of Science and Technology in Krakow, Poland with a master's degree in mining engineering in 1978. He was an engineer in Poland's Silesia coal mines until 1983. In 1988 he emigrated to Canada, and created Gomark Enterprises, a consulting business that designs and supplies interior stone finishes and imports and services machinery used in the stone industry.

He was the president of the Canadian Polish Congress from 2005 to 2010. He assisted in the removal of visa requirements for visitors from Poland. He is also a founding member of Tribute to Liberty, an organization dedicated to building a national monument in Ottawa to honour the victims of communism in the world.

Politics

In the 2011 Canadian federal election, Lizon ran as Conservative candidate in the riding of Mississauga East—Cooksville. He defeated Liberal candidate Peter Fonseca by 676 votes.

In September 2011, Lizon introduced Bill C-266, An Act to establish Pope John Paul II Day, also called by its short title: Pope John Paul II Day Act. A similar bill was first introduced in October 2010 by Liberal MP Andrew Kania. Both bills sought to recognize April 2 as a day to honour the memory of the late Pope John Paul II. Bill C-266 received Royal Assent on December 16, 2014, becoming law. April 2, 2015 marked the 10 year anniversary since the passing of Pope John Paul II and was incidentally the first Pope John Paul II Day observed in Canada.

In 2012, Lizon was criticized by the South Asian community and his colleagues in Parliament when he sent out a survey to his constituents asking what languages they spoke, with one of the languages listed as "Indian".  Jim Karygiannis, the Liberal MP for Scarborough-Agincourt, issued a press release calling the mailer insulting, comparing it to asking someone if they speak Canadian or Mexican.

In 2013, Lizon joined two other Conservative MPs (Saskatchewan MP Maurice Vellacott and Alberta MP Leon Benoit) in writing a letter to the RCMP requesting a homicide investigation into some late term abortions that may have resulted in live births. The letter was criticized as an attempt to reopen the abortion debate. Prime Minister Stephen Harper said, "I think all members of this House, whether they agree with it or not, understand that abortion is legal in Canada and this government, myself included, have made it very clear that the government does not intend to change the law in this regard."

In the 2015 election Lizon again faced Liberal candidate Fonseca. This time Fonseca defeated him by 9,801 votes.

In the recent 2019 Election, Lizon was defeated by Liberal candidate Peter Fonseca by 9,821 votes.

Electoral record

References

External links
 

1954 births
AGH University of Science and Technology alumni
Canadian engineers
Canadian people of Polish descent
Conservative Party of Canada MPs
Living people
Members of the House of Commons of Canada from Ontario
Politicians from Mississauga
Polish emigrants to Canada
21st-century Canadian politicians
People from Nowy Sącz